Tyler Hemming (born May 9, 1985) is a Canadian former soccer player who played in the Canadian Professional Soccer League, USL Premier Development League, Major League Soccer, Veikkausliiga, USL First Division, and the  USSF Division 2.

Career

College and amateur
Hemming played college soccer at Hartwick College from 2003 until 2006, where he was named the Atlantic Soccer Conference Player of the Year in two consecutive years (2005 and 2006. In 2001, he signed with London City of the Canadian Professional Soccer League becoming the youngest player ever to compete in the league. During his tenure with London he was selected for the CPSL All-Star team for two straight seasons. He also played for two years with Ottawa Fury in the USL Premier Development League.

Professional
Hemming was drafted by Toronto FC as the 40th overall pick of the 2007 MLS Supplemental Draft. He played four games for Toronto in his debut season. The team's injury crisis late in the season allowed Hemming to start two matches. Hemming started at right midfield in Toronto FC's opening match of the 2008 season against Columbus, impressing in a losing effort.  Although he started in the Columbus match, he did not play in the following three matches.

He was waived by Toronto FC on April 25, 2008, but rejoined the team in June due to a few unsuccessful spells trialing in Europe.

In September 2008 Hemming was offered a trial by Finnish Veikkausliiga side Tampere United. He made his first appearance for the Tampere-based club on September 13, 2008, in an away match against FC KooTeePee. After featuring in 4 matches, he suffered an injury which ruled him out for the rest of the season and the club decided not to offer him an extension to his contract.

On March 18, 2009, he signed with the Charleston Battery of the USL First Division.

On January 13, 2010 he was traded to the Montreal Impact of the USSF Division 2. In 2011, he returned to the PDL to sign with his hometown FC London. In 2012, he won the PDL Champrionship after defeating Carolina Dynamo by a score of 2–1.

International
He made his debut for the Canada men's national under-23 soccer team on March 12, 2008 against Mexico in an Olympic qualifier match. On May 30, 2009, he made his Senior team debut against Cyprus, replacing Issey Nakajima-Farran in the 68th minute.

References

External links
 Forest City London player profile
 Charleston Battery bio
 MLS player profile
 TamU coach Ari Hjelm on Hemming  (in Finnish)
 Veikkausliiga Player profile (in Finnish)
 

1985 births
Living people
Soccer players from London, Ontario
Association football defenders
Canadian soccer players
Canada men's international soccer players
Canadian expatriate soccer players
Canadian expatriate sportspeople in the United States
Canadian expatriate sportspeople in Finland
Hartwick Hawks men's soccer players
London City players
Ottawa Fury (2005–2013) players
Toronto FC players
Tampere United players
Charleston Battery players
Veikkausliiga players
Montreal Impact (1992–2011) players
Austin Aztex FC players
FC London players
Canadian Soccer League (1998–present) players
USL League Two players
Major League Soccer players
USL First Division players
USSF Division 2 Professional League players
Expatriate footballers in Finland
Expatriate soccer players in the United States
Canada men's youth international soccer players
Canada men's under-23 international soccer players
Toronto FC draft picks